Judith Man (fl. 1640) was an English translator. Her 1640 Epitome of the History of Faire Argenis and Polyarchus was a translation of Nicolas Coeffeteau's 1623 Histoire de Poliarque et d'Argénis, itself an abridged translation of John Barclay's Latin book Argenis.

Life
Judith Man is likely to have been a relative of Peter Man, solicitor to Thomas Wentworth, 1st Earl of Strafford. She says that she was eighteen years old at Christmas 1639, when she made her translation, and a member of the Strafford household. An English Protestant, she had travelled in France with her parents as a child.

Man dedicated her translation to Wentworth's eldest daughter, Anne. Her preface justified translation as an appropriate activity for a woman, combining diversion and self-improvement. Only two extant copies of the translation survive, at the Huntington Library and the Bodleian Library.

Nothing is known of her later life.

Works
 Epitome of the History of Faire Argenis and Polyarchus, 1640

References

English translators
17th-century translators
17th-century English women writers
17th-century English writers
1621 births
Year of birth uncertain
Year of death unknown
French–English translators